Ramesh Kumar (born 1 January 1999) is an Indian cricketer who plays for Punjab in domestic cricket and Kolkata Knight Riders in IPL. He is a left-handed batsman and left-arm spin bowler.

Early life
Ramesh Kumar was born on 1 January 1999 in Jalalabad, Punjab. His family had migrated from Hanumangarh, Rajasthan, to Jalalabad, Punjab.

Indian premier league
In February 2022, he was bought by the Kolkata Knight Riders team for the 2022 Indian Premier League.

References

External links
 

Kolkata Knight Riders cricketers
Indian cricketers
Living people
1999 births